Ram I. Mahato is a professor and chairman of the Department of Pharmaceutical Sciences, University of Nebraska Medical Center, Omaha, United States. He was Professor of Pharmaceutical Sciences and Biomedical Engineering at the University of Tennessee Health Science Center, Memphis.  He was Research Assistant Professor at the University of Utah, Senior Scientist at GeneMedicine Inc and a postdoctoral fellow at the University of Southern California, Washington University in St. Louis, and Kyoto University. He received a PhD in drug delivery from the University of Strathclyde and BS from China Pharmaceutical University. He is a CRS Fellow, AAPS Fellow, Permanent Member of BTSS/NIH Study section (2009–2013), and ASGCT Scientific Advisor (nonviral vectors, 2006–2009).

Research activities
He has expertise in molecular and cell biology, biochemistry, biophysics, polymer chemistry, colloid science, pharmaceutics, and medicine. It allowed him to take a multidisciplinary approach for successful research and training students and post-doctoral fellows. His research is focused on the following areas: (i) micelle and nanoparticulate drug delivery, (ii) oligonucleotides, siRNA, miRNA, shRNA and gene delivery (iii) synthesis of novel polymers, lipopeptides, lipopolymers and cationic lipids (iv) construction of plasmid and adenovirus-based gene and shRNA expression systems. These systems are being tested in various disease areas such as improving islet transplantation to treat type 1 diabetes, cancer (pancreatic, prostate and breast) and liver fibrosis.

Research accomplishments
Delivery and targeting of oligonucleotide and siRNA-based therapies: contributed extensively on the use of antisense and antigene oligonucleotides as well as siRNA for treating liver fibrosis, diabetes and cancer.
Cell-based therapeutics: contributed extensively on genetic modification of human islets for improved islet transplantation.
Polymeric nanomedicines and combination therapy. Contributed extensively on polymeric micellar delivery using novel polymers and combination therapy for treating advanced prostate cancer.
Cytokine gene therapy: Contributed extensively on the use of interleukin-12 (IL-12), interferon-gamma (IFN-γ), vascular endothelial growth factor (VEGF) and growth hormone gene delivery to tumor and diabetes animal models.
Design of gene delivery systems: Developed polymer, lipid, lipopolymer and peptide-based systems to deliver and transfect oligonucleotides and genes to specific organs in vivo and different cell lines in vitro.
Formulation sciences: formulated various small drugs, proteins, oligonucleotides and plasmids for in vitro and in vivo studies.
Drug delivery and pharmacokinetics: determined the pharmacokinetic profiles of small molecules, proteins, oligonucleotides and genes using mice, rats and rabbits.
Synthesis: synthesized water-soluble and insoluble lipopolymers, soluble steroidal peptides, cationic lipids, and conjugated galactose, mannose and FITC to polylysine for gene delivery.
Particulate carrier systems: developed various polymeric nanoparticulate carrier systems.
Lyophilization: lyophilized anticancer drugs and lipid/plasmid complexes.
Intracellular trafficking: Investigated the mechanism of cellular uptake and intracellular trafficking of plasmids and oligonucleotides.

References

1963 births
Living people
Nepalese scientists
University of Southern California fellows
Washington University in St. Louis fellows
Alumni of the University of Strathclyde
China Pharmaceutical University alumni
University of Tennessee faculty
University of Nebraska Medical Center faculty